The 4th Empire Awards ceremony, presented by the British film magazine Empire, honored the best films of 1998 and took place in 1999 at the Park Lane Hotel in London, England. During the ceremony, Empire presented Empire Awards in nine categories as well as three honorary awards. The honorary Movie Masterpiece award was first introduced this year. The awards were sponsored by Stella Artois for the second consecutive year.

Lock, Stock and Two Smoking Barrels, Titanic and  Saving Private Ryan were tied for most awards won with two awards apiece. Lock, Stock and Two Smoking Barrels won the award for Best British Film, while Titanic won the award for Best Film. Other winners included Elizabeth, My Name Is Joe and Sliding Doors with one award apiece. Spike Lee received the Empire Inspiration Award, Freddie Francis received the Lifetime Achievement Award and William Friedkin received the Movie Masterpiece Award for The Exorcist.

Winners and nominees
Winners are listed first and highlighted in boldface.

Multiple awards
The following three films received multiple awards:

Multiple nominations
The following 12 films received multiple nominations:

References

External links
 
 

Empire Award ceremonies
1998 film awards
1999 in British cinema
1999 in London